The North Carolina Tar Heels Men's basketball program is the college basketball team of the University of North Carolina at Chapel Hill. The Tar Heels have won six National Collegiate Athletic Association (NCAA) championships (1957, 1982, 1993, 2005, 2009, and 2017), in addition to a Helms Athletic Foundation retroactive title (1924), and participated in a record twenty-one Final Fours. It is the only school to have reached at least one Final Four for nine straight decades (no other school has done it in more than seven straight) and at least two Final Fours for six straight decades, all while averaging more wins per season played (20.7) than any other program in college basketball. In 2012, ESPN ranked North Carolina No. 1 on its list of the 50 most successful programs of the past fifty years.

North Carolina's six NCAA championships are third-most all-time, behind UCLA (11) and Kentucky (8). UNC has also won eighteen Atlantic Coast Conference tournament (ACC) titles, thirty-two ACC regular season titles, and has appeared in a record twenty-one NCAA Tournament Final Fours. The program has produced many notable players who went on to play in the NBA, including four of ESPN's top 74 players of all-time: Michael Jordan, James Worthy, Vince Carter, and Bob McAdoo (tied for most with UCLA and Georgetown). Many Tar Heel assistant coaches and players have gone on to become head coaches elsewhere.

From the Tar Heels' first season in 1910–11 through the start of the 2021–22 season, the program has amassed a .735 all-time winning percentage (second highest all-time), winning 2,294 games and losing 829 games in 111-plus seasons. The Tar Heels also have the most consecutive 20-win seasons, with 31 from the 1970–71 season through the 2000–01 season. On March 2, 2010, North Carolina became the second college basketball program to reach 2,000 wins in its history. The Tar Heels are currently 3rd all-time in wins. The Tar Heels are one of only four Division I men's basketball programs to have achieved 2,000 victories. Kentucky, Kansas, and Duke are the other three.

Carolina has played 174 games in the NCAA Tournament. The Tar Heels have appeared in the NCAA Tournament championship game twelve times, and have been in a record twenty-one NCAA Tournament Final Fours. The Tar Heels have been selected to the NCAA Tournament 51 times (second-most all-time), and have amassed 130 victories (most all-time). North Carolina won the National Invitation Tournament (NIT) in 1971, and has appeared in two NIT Finals with six appearances in the NIT Tournament. Additionally, the team has been the No. 1 seed in the NCAA tournament seventeen times, the latest being in 2019 (most No. 1 seeds all-time).

North Carolina has been ranked in the top 25 of the AP Poll an all-time record 927 weeks, has beaten AP No. 1 ranked teams a record fourteen times, has the most 25-win seasons with 38, and has the most consecutive top-three ACC regular season finishes with 37. North Carolina has ended the season ranked in the top 25 of the AP Poll 51 times and in the top 25 of the Coaches' Poll 53 times. Furthermore, the Tar Heels have finished the season ranked No. 1 in the AP Poll six times and ranked No. 1 in Coaches' Poll seven times. In 2008, the Tar Heels received the first unanimous preseason No. 1 ranking in the history of either the Coaches' Poll or the AP Poll.

Team history

Early years (1910–1953) 
North Carolina played its first game on January 27, 1911, beating Virginia Christian 42–21 at Bynum Gymnasium, the team's home from 1911 to 1923. The team's first coach was Nat Cartmell. Cartmell was charged with illegally playing dice with known gamblers and was fired after the 1913–14 season. He would be replaced by Charles Doak.

In the 1914–15 season, UNC joined the SAIAA, and would compete in the conference through the 1920–21 season. The 1917–18 team went 9–3 (7–0 at home) to finish 3rd in the SAIAA. On January 24, 1920, North Carolina beat Trinity College (Duke), 36–25, in the first-ever game of the Carolina-Duke rivalry.

SoCon years
In 1921, the school joined the Southern Conference. Overall, the Tar Heels played 32 seasons in the Southern Conference from 1921 to 1953. During that period they won 304 games and lost 111 for a winning percentage of 73.3%. The Tar Heels won the Southern Conference regular season title 9 times and the Southern Conference tournament 8 times.

In 1924, the Tar Heels moved to the Tin Can for home games. From 1924 to 1938, UNC would go 130–20 (.867 winning percentage) at the Tin Can. Rudimentarily built of steel, attempts to heat the Tin Can failed, with ice often forming inside: 

On February 29, 1924, UNC beat Kentucky, 41–20, in the first-ever game of the Kentucky–North Carolina rivalry. The 1923–24 Tar Heels squad went 26–0, and was awarded a national championship by the Helms Athletic Foundation in 1943 and later by the Premo-Porretta Power Poll. In North Carolina's first five seasons in the SoCon (from 1921–22 to 1925–26), they went 96–17, won four SoCon regular season championships, and four SoCon tournament championships. Their fast style of play and stingy defense earned these teams the nickname "White Phantoms", coined by sportswriter Oscar Bane Keeler of the Atlanta Journal, used as an alternative nickname for the Tar Heels through 1950.

Cartwright Carmichael was the first Tar Heel to earn first-team All-America honors in any sport in 1923, and was again selected in 1924. Jack Cobb was UNC's first three-time All-America (1924, 1925, 1926), and was named Helms Foundation Player of the Year in 1926. George Glamack followed suit in 1940 and 1941, being named Helms Foundation Player of the Year also. Both, Cobb and Glamack, are honored with their numbers being retired (Cobb did not have a number).

In 1939, the Tar Heels relocated their home arena to the Woollen Gymnasium, where they would play until 1965. On March 21, 1946, under Hall of Fame coach Ben Carnevale and All-Americans Hook Dillon and Jim Jordan, North Carolina beat NYU, 57–49, for their first win in the NCAA Tournament ever. Later in the 1946 NCAA tournament, UNC advanced to their first ever Final Four. Oklahoma A&M would beat UNC, 43–40, in the championship game.

For most of the first four decades of the program's history, North Carolina had very little consistency at the head coaching position, reflecting the lack of emphasis on the sport in much of the South at the time. The first coach, Cartmell, doubled as the track coach. From 1923 to 1926, three coaches led the program in as many years. Norman Shepard led the team to an undefeated season in 1923–24 while attending law school. He was succeeded by one of his players, medical student Monk McDonald, who in turn gave way to Harlan Sanborn. Other early coaches included baseball coaches Charles Doak and James Ashmore and assistant football coach Bill Lange. All told, from 1910 to 1946, no coach stayed in Chapel Hill longer than five years. Carnevale, who led UNC to its first Final Four, left after only two years. Tom Scott ran the program for six years from 1946 to 1952, but was pushed out in favor of Frank McGuire after two consecutive losing years.

Frank McGuire (1953–1961)

The modern era of Tar Heel basketball began in 1952, when Scott was pushed out after two consecutive losing seasons in favor of St. John's head coach Frank McGuire. School officials wanted a big-name coach to counter the rise of North Carolina State under Everett Case.

On December 1, 1952, McGuire coached his first game at UNC with a 70–50 win over The Citadel. In 1953, North Carolina split from the Southern Conference and became a founding member of the Atlantic Coast Conference. On December 12, 1953, UNC beat South Carolina, 82–56, in their first ACC game ever. On December 14, 1955, UNC routed then-No. 5 Alabama 99–77. It was UNC's first defeat of a nonconference opponent ranked in the top 10 of a major media poll. On January 14, 1956, All-American Lennie Rosenbluth scored 45 points in a 103–99 win at Clemson. On February 24, 1956, Rosenbluth had 31 points in a 73–65 win over Duke to clinch UNC's first-ever ACC regular-season title (shared with N.C. State). The following season, in 1956–57, Lennie Rosenbluth scored 40 in a Tar Heel win at Duke to finish with a perfect 24–0 regular season record (14–0 in ACC). Rosenbluth was named 1957 Helms Foundation Player of the Year. Furthermore, in 1957, the Tar Heels won their first ACC Tournament and first NCAA Championship. On March 23, 1957, No. 1 North Carolina beat Wilt Chamberlain and No. 2 Kansas, 54–53, in triple overtime as Carolina capped off a perfect 32–0 season as national champions. C.D. Chesley, a Washington, D.C. television producer, piped the 1957 championship game in Kansas City to a hastily created network of five stations across North Carolina—the ancestor to the longstanding syndicated ACC football and basketball package from Raycom Sports—which helped prove pivotal in basketball becoming a craze in the state. The title game was the only triple overtime final game in championship history, which followed a triple overtime North Carolina defeat of Michigan State 74–70 the previous night.

In 1961, the Tar Heels were placed on NCAA probation for a year for violating "provisions prohibiting excessive entertainment" of prospective players and providing "improper financial assistance" to the parents of players. As a result, they were barred from the 1961 NCAA tournament and also withdrew from the 1961 ACC tournament.  Following the season, Chancellor William Aycock forced McGuire to resign.  As a replacement, Aycock selected one of McGuire's assistants, Kansas alumnus Dean Smith.

Dean Smith (1961–1997)

On December 2, 1961, Carolina beat Virginia, 80–46, in Dean Smith's first game as head coach. Smith's early teams were not nearly as successful as McGuire's had been. His first team went only 8–9, the last losing season UNC would suffer for 40 years. On January 13, 1964, All-American Deakon Patrick scored 40 and had 28 rebounds in 97–88 win over Maryland. On December 4, 1965, UNC beat William and Mary, 82–68, in the first game played at UNC's new home, Carmichael Auditorium. On December 16, 1965, Bobby Lewis scored a current UNC-record 49 points in 115–80 win over Florida State. Smith's first five teams never won more than 16 games. This grated on a fan base used to winning; in 1965 some of them even hanged him in effigy. Smith would go on to take the Tar Heels to a reign of championships and national dominance. On March 17, 1967, North Carolina beat Princeton for Dean Smith's first NCAA Tournament win. Later, in the 1967 NCAA tournament, UNC beat Boston College to advance to Dean Smith's first Final Four, where they would lose to Dayton in the national semifinal. In 1968, Carolina appeared in their second consecutive Final Four. On March 23, 1968, they lost to Lew Alcindor and UCLA for the national title. On March 15, 1969, All-American Charlie Scott hit the game-winning jumper at the buzzer to beat Davidson, 87–85, to advance North Carolina to their third consecutive Final Four. On March 27, 1971, Bill Chamberlain scored 34 points as UNC beat Georgia Tech, 84–66, to win the NIT. On March 18, 1972, Carolina beat Penn, 73–59, to advance to their 4th Final Four in 6 years. All-American Bob McAdoo had 24 points and 15 rebounds, but fouled out with 13 minutes to play, as UNC lost to Florida State in the national semifinal. On March 26, 1977, the Tar Heels, back in the Final Four, edged UNLV, 84–83, in the national semifinal. Carolina, in the championship two days later, lost to Marquette, 67–59. On February 25, 1978, co-consensus National Player of the Year Phil Ford scored 34 points in his final game at Carmichael Auditorium, an 87–83 win over Duke. North Carolina returned to the Final Four in 1981. In the national semifinal, All-American Al Wood scored 39 in a win over Virginia. UNC would lose in the NCAA championship game to Indiana.

The following year, North Carolina won their second NCAA championship. On March 29, 1982, Final Four MOP James Worthy scored 28 points and Michael Jordan hit the game-winning shot with 17 seconds to play as Carolina beat Georgetown, 63–62, to win Dean Smith's first national championship. On January 18, 1986, North Carolina beat Duke, 95–92, in the first game played in UNC's new arena, the Dean Smith Center. On March 24, 1991, Carolina beat Temple, 75–72, to advance to the Final Four for the first time since 1982. In the national semifinal, Carolina fell to former UNC assistant coach Roy Williams and Kansas, 79–73. In 1993, UNC won their third NCAA title. On April 5, 1993, Final Four MOP Donald Williams scored 25 points as Carolina beat Michigan, 77–71, for Dean Smith's second NCAA championship. On March 25, 1995, North Carolina beat Kentucky, 74–61, to advance to another Final Four. UNC would fall to Arkansas, in the national semifinal. On March 15, 1997, North Carolina beat Colorado, 73–56, in the NCAA tournament second round for Dean Smith's 877th win, breaking Adolph Rupp's all-time record for coaches. On March 23, 1997, the Tar Heels beat Louisville, 97–74, for another Final Four appearance. Smith would coach his final game, a 66–58 loss to Arizona in the national semifinal, on March 29, 1997. After 36 years as head coach, Smith retired on October 9, 1997. When he retired, Smith's 879 wins were the most ever for any NCAA Division I men's basketball coach (currently 5th all-time). During his tenure, North Carolina won or shared 17 ACC regular-season titles and won 13 ACC tournaments. They went to the NCAA tournament 27 times–including 23 in a row from 1975 to 1997–appeared in 11 Final Fours, and won NCAA tournament titles in 1982 and 1993. The 1982 national championship team was led by James Worthy, Sam Perkins, and a young Michael Jordan. The 1993 national championship team starred Donald Williams, George Lynch and Eric Montross. While at North Carolina, Smith helped promote desegregation by recruiting the University's first African American scholarship basketball player Charlie Scott.

Bill Guthridge (1997–2000)
Smith unexpectedly retired before the start of practice for the 1997–98 season. He was succeeded by Bill Guthridge, who had been an assistant coach at the school for 30 years, the last 25 as Smith's top assistant. During Guthridge's three seasons as head coach he posted an 80–28 record, making him tied for the then-NCAA record for most wins by a coach after three seasons. The Tar Heels reached the NCAA Final Four twice, in the 1998 tournament and again in the 2000 tournament. North Carolina reached the Final Four in 2000 as an 8-seed, their lowest seeding in a Final Four appearance.

Matt Doherty (2000–2003)
Guthridge retired in 2000 and North Carolina turned to Matt Doherty, the head coach at Notre Dame and a player on the 1982 championship team, to lead the Tar Heels. Doherty had little success while at North Carolina. In his first season, the Heels were ranked No. 1 in the polls in the middle of the Atlantic Coast Conference schedule and finished with a 26–7 record. The bottom fell out the following year, as the Tar Heels finished the season with a record of 8–20, the worst season in school history. They missed postseason play entirely for the first time since the 1965–66 season (including a record 27 straight NCAA Tournament appearances) and finished with a losing record for the first time since 1962 (Dean Smith's first year as coach). They also finished 4–12 in the ACC—only the program's second losing ACC record ever. The 12 losses were six more than the Tar Heels had ever suffered in a single season of ACC play, and placed them in a tie for 7th place—the program's first finish below fourth place ever. The season also saw the end of UNC's run of 31 straight 20-win seasons and 35 straight seasons of finishing third or higher in the ACC.

After bringing in one of the top 5 incoming classes for the 2002–2003 season, the Tar Heels started the season by knocking off a top 5 Kansas team and going on to win the Preseason NIT and returning to the AP top 25. North Carolina went on to finish the season 17–15, but a 6–10 record in ACC play kept them out of the NCAA Tournament. Doherty led the Tar Heels to the third round of the NIT, where they ended their season with a loss to Georgetown.

Roy Williams (2003–2021)
Despite the turnaround from the year before and the NIT appearance, at the end of the season Matt Doherty was replaced as head coach by Roy Williams. Williams had served as an assistant to Smith for 11 years before a successful 15-year tenure at Kansas, winning 9 conference regular season championships and taking his Jayhawk teams to four Final Fours. Smith himself convinced Williams to return home. Williams had also been courted by Smith for the UNC job when it had been open in 2000, but Williams had promised Nick Collison he would be at Kansas his entire college career, and could not bring himself to leave Kansas at that time despite media speculation reporting Williams would take the job in 2000. Williams could not turn his mentor down a second time, so just two weeks after Doherty's resignation, Williams took the Carolina job. Williams was UNC's third coach in six years, the most turnover the program had faced since its early years. The previous two, McGuire and Smith, had covered a 45-year period.

On November 22, 2003, Carolina beat Old Dominion, 90–64, in Roy Williams’ first game as head coach. In Williams' first season, the Tar Heels finished 19–11 and were ranked in a final media poll for the first time in three years. They returned to the NCAA tournament and were ousted in the second round by Texas. The following year, on April 4, 2005, the Tar Heels defeated Illinois, 75–70, to win their fourth NCAA title and Williams' first as a head coach. After winning the championship, Williams lost his top seven scorers, but the 2005–06 season saw the arrival of freshman Tyler Hansbrough and Williams was named Coach of the Year. The Tar Heels swept the ACC regular season and tournament titles in 2007 and 2008. The 2008 ACC tournament was the first time North Carolina had ever won the ACC Tournament without defeating at least one in-state rival during the tournament. North Carolina lost in the national semifinals of the 2008 NCAA tournament to Williams' former program Kansas.

On December 18, 2008, Tyler Hansbrough scored his 2,292nd career point, breaking Phil Ford's UNC career scoring record. In the 2008–09 season, the Tar Heels won their fifth NCAA title by defeating Michigan State in the championship of the 2009 NCAA men's basketball tournament. The Tar Heels won all six of that year's tournament games by at least 12 points, for an average victory margin of 20.2 points, and only trailed for a total of 10 minutes out of 240 through the entire tournament. Wayne Ellington was named the tournament's Most Outstanding Player, the fourth Tar Heel so honored.

The 2009–2010 Tar Heels struggled throughout the regular season finishing with a 16–15 record, and dropped to No. 3 in Division I in all-time wins. They later lost in the first round of the ACC Tournament, playing in the first "play-in" Thursday game for the first time since the ACC grew to 12 teams. The Tar Heels did not receive an NCAA tournament bid, and instead accepted a bid to the NIT. During the season, on March 2, 2010, Carolina beat Miami, 69–62, to become the second school in NCAA history to win its 2,000th game (North Carolina was in its 100th season of basketball at the time of this accomplishment). The Tar Heels made it to the final game of the NIT, losing to Dayton in the final game finishing with a 20–17 record.

The 2010–2011 Tar Heels, with the addition of Harrison Barnes, Kendall Marshall, and Reggie Bullock, eighth in the preseason polls, struggled out the gates, starting with a 2–2 record, the worst start since the 2001–02 season. After losses to Illinois and Texas, the Tar Heels fell out of the rankings. The losses of senior Will Graves, to dismissal, and Larry Drew II, to transfer and also the unexpected off-season transfers of David and Travis Wear did not help matters. However, the Tar Heels improved greatly during the conference season, finishing first in the ACC regular season with a 14–2 record. Williams was named Conference Coach of the Year for his efforts of getting his team to work through the adversity to finish strong in the regular season. Also during the season, the term Tar Heel Blue Steel was coined, referencing the Tar Heel men's basketball walk-ons. The term was started by one of the players, Stewart Cooper, in hopes that it would be a replacement for "walk-ons" and similar names, and soon enough Roy Williams caught on.
North Carolina lost to Duke in the ACC Tournament Final and made a significant run in the NCAA Tournament until they were eliminated in the Elite Eight by Kentucky, finishing with a 29–8 record.

The 2011–2012 Tar Heels season started on November 11, 2011, as top-ranked Carolina beat Michigan State, 67–55, on the deck of the aircraft carrier USS Carl Vinson in San Diego. The Tar Heels finished the season with a record of 32–6, including a 14–2 ACC record to win the conference regular-season championship outright. The team fell to Florida State in the championship game of the 2012 ACC tournament and was a No. 1 seed in the Midwest Regional of the 2012 NCAA tournament; the team reached the Elite Eight and was defeated by Kansas 80–67. Before the Kansas game, the Tar Heels won their previous three games in the NCAA Tournament by an average of 13.7 points. In the second-round game versus Creighton, starting UNC point guard Kendall Marshall broke his right wrist with 10:56 remaining in the second half with UNC leading 66–50. Marshall continued to play by dribbling primarily with his left hand and left the game with two minutes left with UNC leading 85–69. Williams announced the injury at the Creighton post-game press conference. Marshall did not play in UNC's two following games in the NCAA Tournament, a 73–65 overtime win over Ohio in the Sweet 16 and the aforementioned 67–80 loss to Kansas in the Elite Eight.

With the departures of several stars from the 2012 team, The Tar Heels would begin a slow climb back to the top following the Elite Eight loss. The 2012–13 season ended with a loss to Kansas in the tournament for the second year in a row. In 2013–14, the Tar Heels became the only team in men's college basketball history to beat every team ranked in the top 4 in the preseason. The Tar Heels would finish 24–10 that year, ending the year by losing to Iowa State in the final seconds of the Round of 32. The 2014–15 team would improve, finishing the year 4th in the ACC and a Sweet 16 appearance, where they would lose to the Wisconsin. It was also the year that North Carolina would add Joel Berry II and Justin Jackson to the roster, who were both key contributors to the 2017 National Championship squad.

In 2015–16, led by seniors Marcus Paige and Brice Johnson, the Tar Heels earned their 30th ACC regular season title, 18th ACC tournament title, and 19th Final Four. They also appeared in their 10th NCAA title game, in which they lost on a buzzer beater to Villanova, despite Marcus Paige's dramatic three-pointer to tie the game with 4.7 seconds left. The Tar Heels finished with a 33–7 overall record and a 14–4 ACC record.

The following year, the Tar Heels were ranked No. 6 in the AP preseason poll, having lost Paige and Johnson but retaining 2016 ACC Tournament MVP Joel Berry II as well as forwards Kennedy Meeks and Isaiah Hicks. After early season losses to Indiana and Kentucky, the Tar Heels won their 31st ACC regular season title. Despite never being ranked No. 1 in the AP Poll and losing to Duke in the semifinals of the ACC tournament, the Heels earned a No. 1 seed in the NCAA tournament. On March 26, 2017, Luke Maye hit a jump shot with 0.3 seconds left to beat second-seed Kentucky, 75–73, to advance to Carolina's record 20th Final Four. On April 3, 2017, Final Four MOP Joel Berry II scored 22 points as UNC beat Gonzaga, 71–65, to give Williams his 3rd national championship, surpassing mentor Dean Smith for NCAA Tournament championships. Just as in the previous year, the Tar Heels finished with a 33–7 overall record and a 14–4 ACC record.

In 2017–18, the Tar Heels were ranked at No. 9 in the AP and Coaches poll. Forwards Isaiah Hicks, Kennedy Meeks, Tony Bradley, and Justin Jackson had left, while the team added Cameron Johnson. This season, the team did not win the ACC regular season or tournament title. However, the Heels earned a No. 2 seed in the NCAA Tournament and ended the season 26–11 after being eliminated by Texas A&M in the Round of 32 in the NCAA Tournament.

In the 2018–19 season, the Tar Heels were led by freshman point guard Coby White, and seniors Luke Maye and Cameron Johnson. The Tar Heels were co-ACC regular season champions with Virginia, earned another Number 1 seed in the NCAA Tournament, and made it to the Sweet Sixteen round before being eliminated by the Auburn Tigers.

2019–20 was an unusually down year for the Tar Heels, only winning 14 games and being swept by arch-rival Duke in the regular season. Freshman point guard Cole Anthony's knee injury and a lack of depth on the bench proved devastating for the Tar Heels, as they were unable to carry momentum through ACC play, losing several games on last second shots after starting the season 6–1. The Tar Heels made it to the second-round of the ACC tournament before losing to Syracuse in what would turn out to be the final ACC tournament game played before the cancellation of the rest of the 2019–20 season due to the emerging COVID-19 pandemic. Williams passed Smith's mark of 879 all-time wins in the COVID-shortened season. 

Heading into the 2020–21 season, expectations were high after the lackluster, injury-filled performance of the season prior. Coming into the season with a talented freshman recruiting class, the Tar Heels looked to rebound from their 14–19 record. Senior Garrison Brooks was picked as the preseason ACC Player of the Year, yet failed to live up to the preseason hype. Sophomore forward Armando Bacot led the Tar Heels in scoring, and the emergence of freshman Kerwin Walton provided the Tar Heels with an outside shooter that had been missing on the previous year's team. However, the Heels stumbled out of the starting block, beginning conference play with an 0–2 record in the ACC. However, the Tar Heels rebounded, and returned the favor to the Blue Devils, sweeping them in the two regular season matchups. Freshman guard Caleb Love scored 25 points and 7 assists against Duke in Durham, breaking an at-Duke assist record set by Ty Lawson in 2009. On February 27, 2021, Williams earned his 900th career victory as a head coach against Florida State, becoming the fastest coach to reach that mark, over the fewest number of games. The Tar Heels finished with a record of 18–11, losing to Wisconsin in the first round of the NCAA tournament.

On April 1, 2021, Roy Williams announced his retirement as the head coach of the Tar Heels after 48 years in coaching and 33 years as a collegiate head coach, 18 of which came at the helm of his alma mater. Williams ended his coaching career with 903 career wins, 485 of which came at Carolina, and three national championships, all as the Tar Heel head coach. At the time of his retirement, Williams was third all-time in NCAA Division I victories. Williams is the first coach to earn 400 or more wins at two different schools. Athletic Director Bubba Cunningham announced that evening that a search for the next head coach would begin immediately, with the search being headed up by Cunningham and UNC-Chapel Hill chancellor Kevin Guskiewicz.

Hubert Davis (2021–present) 
Four days after Williams retired, assistant coach and former Tar Heel player Hubert Davis was hired as his successor. Davis, the nephew of Tar Heel and NBA great Walter Davis, became the first African-American to lead the program. With a 70–63 victory against Louisville on February 21, 2022, Davis reached 20 wins in his first season as head coach. After an up-and-down start to the regular season that included some blowout losses, Davis' Tar Heels turned a corner in the latter part of ACC conference play. The team coupled the renewed energy and intensity with a shock 94–81 upset victory over Duke in Mike Krzyzewski's final home game at Cameron Indoor Stadium. The Tar Heels earned an 8 seed in the NCAA tournament and upset the East Region's No. 1 seed, Baylor in the second round, despite the ejection of star forward Brady Manek following a flagrant foul. The Tar Heels defeated UCLA in the Sweet Sixteen and Saint Peter's in the Elite Eight to earn a trip to the 2022 Final Four in New Orleans. In a rematch of the regular season finale against Duke, the Tar Heels defeated Duke 81–77 in Mike Krzyzewski's final game as a head coach in the national semifinal.  The Tar Heels faced the Kansas Jayhawks in the National Championship game, during which they were unable to capitalize on a double-digit halftime lead and were defeated by a final score of 69–72, finishing the season as National Runner-Up.

The Carolina Way
Dean Smith was widely known for his idea of "The Carolina Way", in which he challenged his players to "Play hard, play smart, play together". "The Carolina Way" was an idea of excellence in the classroom, as well as on the court. In Coach Smith's book The Carolina Way, former player Scott Williams said, regarding Dean Smith: "Winning was very important at Carolina, and there was much pressure to win, but Coach cared more about our getting a sound education and turning into good citizens than he did about winning." "The Carolina Way" was evident in many practices the players would implement, including pointing to the player who assisted in a basket, giving him credit as an act of selflessness. This "Thank the Passer" practice is used throughout basketball today.

Streaks

The Tar Heels own several notable streaks in the history of college basketball. They appeared in either the NCAA Tournament or National Invitation Tournament (NIT) every year from 1967 to 2001. This includes 27 straight appearances in the NCAA tourney from 1975 (the first year that competition allowed more than one team from a conference to get a guaranteed bid) to 2001—the longest such streak in tournament history until it was broken by Kansas in March 2017. The Tar Heels also notched 37 straight winning seasons from 1964 to 2001, the third-longest such streak in NCAA history, behind UCLA's streak of 54 consecutive winning seasons from 1948 to 2001, and Syracuse's streak of 46 seasons.  They also finished .500 or better for 39 years in a row from 1962 (Dean Smith's second year) to 2001, the third-longest such streak in NCAA history, behind Kentucky's streak of 61 consecutive seasons from 1926 to 1988 (the Wildcats were barred from playing in 1952–53 due to NCAA violations) and UCLA's 54-season streak.

From the ACC's inception in 1953 to 2001, the Tar Heels did not finish worse than a tie for fourth place in ACC play. By comparison, all of the ACC's other charter members finished last at least once in that time.  From 1965 to 2001, they did not finish worse than a tie for third, and for the first 21 of those years they did not finish worse than a tie for second.

All of these streaks ended in the 2001–02 season, when the Tar Heels finished 8–20 on the season under coach Matt Doherty. They also finished tied for 7th in conference play, behind Florida State and Clemson—only their second losing conference record ever (the first being in the ACC's inaugural season).

Additionally, the Tar Heels went 59–0 all-time in home games played against the Clemson Tigers (the NCAA record for the longest home winning streak against a single opponent). The Tar Heels' all-time home winning streak against Clemson lasted until the 2019–2020 season where Clemson stunned the Tar Heels in overtime, 79–76. Until the 2010 ACC tournament, North Carolina was the only program to have never played a Thursday game in the ACC tournament since it expanded to a four-day format.

The Tar Heels have three stretches of being ranked for more than 100 consecutive weeks in the AP Poll. They spent 172 consecutive weeks in the rankings from the start of the 1990–91 season until early in the 1999–2000 season, the second-longest streak in college basketball history at the time behind only UCLA's run of 231 consecutive weeks from 1966 to 1980. That streak has since been passed by Duke's run of 200 consecutive weeks from 1997 to 2007 and Kansas' 231 consecutive weeks from 2009 to 2021. They were also ranked for 171 consecutive weeks from 1973 to 1983, and for 106 consecutive weeks from 2014 to 2020.

By the numbers
 All-time wins – 2,343
 All-time winning Percentage – .733
 NCAA championships – 6
 NCAA Tournament runner-up – 6
 All-Americans – 49 players chosen 78 times
 ACC regular season titles – 32
 ACC Tournament titles – 18
 NCAA championship games – 12
 NCAA Final Fours – 21 (most all-time)
 NCAA Tournament appearances – 52
 NCAA Tournament wins – 131 (most all-time)
 No. 1 seeds in the NCAA Tournament – 17
 Number of weeks ranked all-time in the top 25 of the AP Poll – 928
 Number of times defeating the No. 1 ranked team in the country – 14

Victories over AP No. 1 team
North Carolina has 14 victories over the AP number one ranked team.

January 14, 1959 – UNC 72, No. 1 NC State 68
January 12, 1980 – No. 15 UNC 82, No. 1 Duke 67
November 21, 1987 – UNC 96, No. 1 Syracuse 93
January 18, 1989 – No. 13 UNC 91, No. 1 Duke 71
March 17, 1990 – NR UNC 79, No. 1 Oklahoma, 77
February 5, 1992 – No. 9 UNC 75, No. 1 Duke 73
February 3, 1994 – No. 2 UNC 89, No. 1 Duke 78
February 5, 1998 – No. 2 UNC 97, No. 1 Duke 73
March 8, 1998 – No. 3 UNC 83, No. 1 Duke 68
January 17, 2004 – UNC 86, No. 1 Connecticut 83 
April 4, 2005 – No. 2 UNC 75, No. 1 Illinois 70
March 4, 2006 – No. 13 UNC 83, No. 1 Duke 76
December 4, 2013 – NR UNC 79, No. 1 Michigan State 65
February 20, 2019 – No. 8 UNC 88, No. 1 Duke 72

Honored and retired jerseys

Retired numbers

Eight players (including Jack Cobb, whose jersey did not have a number) have had their numbers retired. Tyler Hansbrough's number 50 is the eighth to be retired, after he won all six major player of the year awards during the 2007–08 season.

51 former North Carolina men's basketball players are honored in the Smith Center with banners representing their numbers hung from the rafters. Of the 51 honored jerseys, eight are retired.

Honored jerseys
In addition to the eight retired jerseys, an additional 43 jerseys are honored. Joel Berry II and Justin Jackson most recently qualified to have their jerseys honored.

To have his jersey honored, a player must have met one of the following criteria:
MVP of a National Championship-winning team
Member of a gold medal-winning Olympic team
First- or second-team All-America
ACC Player of the Year
NCAA Tournament MOP

Notable players and coaches

Tar Heels inducted into the Naismith Memorial Basketball Hall of Fame 
To date twelve Tar Heels have been inducted into the Basketball Hall of Fame

Tar Heels in the Olympics

Current players in the NBA
Cole Anthony, Orlando Magic
Harrison Barnes, Sacramento Kings
Tony Bradley, Chicago Bulls
Reggie Bullock, Dallas Mavericks
Danny Green, Cleveland Cavaliers
Cameron Johnson, Brooklyn Nets
Nassir Little, Portland Trail Blazers
Theo Pinson, Dallas Mavericks
Day'Ron Sharpe, Brooklyn Nets
Coby White, Chicago Bulls

Current players in international leagues
Source:
 Nate Britt, Yoast United (BNXT League)
 Isaiah Hicks, Seoul Samsung Thunders (Korean Basketball League)
 Desmond Hubert, Al-Arabi (Kuwaiti Division I Basketball League)
 Joel James, TED Ankara Kolejliler (TBL)
 Brice Johnson, Toyama Grouses (B.League)
 Christian Keeling, BC Rustavi (Georgian Superliga)
 Justin Knox, San-en NeoPhoenix (B.League)
 Ty Lawson, US Monastir (Championnat National A)
 Sterling Manley, Sichuan Blue Whales (CBA)
 Luke Maye, Baxi Manresa (Liga ACB)
 James Michael McAdoo, Sun Rockers Shibuya (B.League)
 Kennedy Meeks, Cholet Basket (LNB Pro A)
 Marcus Paige, Orléans Loiret Basket (LNB Pro A)
 Justin Pierce, BC Nokia (Korisliiga)
 Reyshawn Terry, Plateros de Fresnillo (LNBP)
 Deon Thompson, Casademont Zaragoza (Liga ACB)
 Jawad Williams, Yamagata Wyverns (B.League)
 Kenny Williams, Kolossos Rodou (Greek Basket League)
 JP Tokoto, Hapoel Tel Aviv (Israeli Basketball Premier League)

NBA coaches and executives 
Larry Brown, former head coach of the Charlotte Bobcats, New York Knicks, Detroit Pistons, Philadelphia 76ers, Indiana Pacers, Los Angeles Clippers, San Antonio Spurs, New Jersey Nets, Denver Nuggets
Billy Cunningham, former head coach of the Philadelphia 76ers, former part owner of Miami Heat
Walter Davis, former advance scout for the Washington Wizards
Phil Ford, former assistant coach of the Detroit Pistons, New York Knicks, Charlotte Bobcats 
Michael Jordan, owner and chairman of the Charlotte Hornets, former part owner and president of basketball operations of the Washington Wizards, former managing member of basketball operations of the Charlotte Bobcats 
George Karl, former head coach of the Sacramento Kings, Denver Nuggets, Milwaukee Bucks, Seattle SuperSonics, Golden State Warriors, Cleveland Cavaliers
John Kuester, advance scout for the Los Angeles Lakers, former head coach of the Detroit Pistons
Mitch Kupchak, general manager of the Charlotte Hornets, former general manager of the Los Angeles Lakers
Bob McAdoo, former assistant coach of the Miami Heat
Doug Moe, former head coach of the Philadelphia 76ers, Denver Nuggets, San Antonio Spurs 
Mike O'Koren, former assistant coach of the New Jersey Nets, Washington Wizards, Philadelphia 76ers
Sam Perkins, former vice president of player relations for the Indiana Pacers 
Buzz Peterson, assistant general manager of the Charlotte Hornets
Rasheed Wallace, former assistant coach of the Detroit Pistons
Scott Williams, assistant coach of the Milwaukee Bucks
Joe Wolf, head coach of the Greensboro Swarm, former assistant coach of the Milwaukee Bucks and Brooklyn Nets

Other fields
Ronald Curry, former wide receiver for the Oakland Raiders (2002–2008)
Brad Daugherty, NBC and NASCAR television analyst and part-owner of JTG Daugherty Racing NASCAR race team (2008–present)
James Delany, commissioner of the Big Ten Conference (1967–1970)
Brendan Haywood, college basketball announcer for CBS Sports
Antawn Jamison, analyst for Time Warner Cable SportsNet
Wes Miller, head coach of the Cincinnati Bearcats men's basketball team
Julius Peppers, former defensive end for the Carolina Panthers, Chicago Bears, and Green Bay Packers (2002–2018)
Jerry Stackhouse, head coach of the Vanderbilt Commodores men's basketball team
Richard Vinroot, former mayor of Charlotte, North Carolina (1961–1963)

Rivalries

Traditional rivalries

Other major programs

UNC alumni defeated UCLA alumni 116–111 in an exhibition game in Los Angeles, CA on June 29, 1987.

Carolina Basketball Museum

The Carolina Basketball Museum is located in the Ernie Williamson Athletics Center and contains . It was built to replace the old memorabilia room in the Dean Smith Center. Designed by Gallagher & Associates, the cost of construction was $3.4 million. The museum opened in January 2008.

UNC junior varsity basketball team

The UNC junior varsity basketball team was originally used at North Carolina as freshmen teams because freshmen were not allowed to play on the varsity team until the NCAA granted freshmen eligibility in the Fall of 1972.

After most schools decided to disband their J.V. squads, North Carolina's athletic department opted to keep the team so that non-scholarship students were given the chance to play basketball for UNC. North Carolina also uses their J.V. team as a way for varsity assistant coaches to gain experience as head coaches, such as the current coach, Hubert Davis. Roy Williams was a J.V. coach for eight years before he was hired at Kansas.

Students at UNC are only allowed to play on the team for two years, and then they are given a chance to try out for the varsity. The J.V. team also serves as a way for coaches to evaluate players for two years on the J.V. so they will better know what to expect when they try out for varsity later in their careers.

UNC's J.V. team plays a combination of teams from Division II and III schools, some community colleges, and a few prep schools from around the North Carolina area.

Seasons

Records 
Most all-time Final Four appearances
Most ACC regular season titles
Longest winning streak at home versus one opponent
Most Consecutive 20-win seasons
Most consecutive top-three ACC finishes
Most No. 1 NCAA Tournament seeds
Most 25-win seasons
Most Sweet Sixteens

Home venues

Bynum Gymnasium (1910–1924)
Tin Can (1924–1938)
Woollen Gymnasium (1938–1964)
Carmichael Auditorium (1965–1986)
Dean Smith Center (1986–present)

References

External links
 

 
Basketball teams established in 1910
1910 establishments in North Carolina